Belsonic is the name of an outdoor music festival owned by Thomas Edwards which has taken place in August at the Custom House Square in Belfast, Northern Ireland since 2008. It is organised by Shine Productions Ltd. The capacity of the event is 15,000 as of 2019. As of 2017, Belsonic is held in Ormeau Park.

Belsonic 2020 was cancelled due to COVID-19 with plans to reschedule the event in 2021.The event was due to take place in Ormeau Park from 7 to 28 June.

References

External links
 Official Site

Music in Belfast
Rock festivals in Ireland
Rock festivals in the United Kingdom
Music festivals in Northern Ireland
Electronic music festivals in Ireland
Summer events in Northern Ireland
Festivals in Belfast